Jason Gray is an American poet whose first book, Photographing Eden, was the winner of the 2008 Hollis Summers Poetry Prize. His second, Radiation King, won the Idaho Prize for Poetry from Lost Horse Press. Gray's poems have been published in The American Poetry Review, The Kenyon Review, Poetry, and other prominent literary journals. He serves as co-editor of the online journal poetry journal, Unsplendid, and was a 2009 Peter Taylor Fellow at the Kenyon Review Writers' Workshop.

His other awards and honors include a Walter Dakin Fellowship to the Sewanee Writers' Conference, an Individual Artist Award from the Maryland State Council for the Arts, and a fellowship from the Vermont Studio Center.

Bibliography
 Winner of the 2003 National Poetry Chapbook Prize

 Wick Poetry Chapbook Series

References

21st-century American poets
21st-century American male writers
American male poets
Living people
Ohio State University alumni
Year of birth missing (living people)